A SCSI Peripheral Device Type describes the capabilities provided by a SCSI device. It is a five-bit field in the first byte returned in response to an INQUIRY SCSI command.

Defined values are:

References

SCSI